Emneth Hungate is a small settlement near the village of Emneth in Norfolk, England, near the border with Cambridgeshire. It once had its own Emneth railway station on the now-closed line between Watlington and Wisbech.

Notable residents 
Tony Martin, farmer convicted of murder after killing a burglar at his farm in 1999.

External links

Hamlets in Norfolk
King's Lynn and West Norfolk